Dynamic Chord (stylized as DYNAMIC CHORD) is a Japanese otome musical-themed visual novel game series developed and published by Honeybee Black. The games follow the musical careers and personal lives of several bands under the "Dynamic Chord" agency and music label. Each games feature different protagonist who develops love story with the band members. An anime adaptation by Studio Pierrot premiered on October 5, 2017.

Characters

Protagonists

rêve parfait
 / King

 / Bishop

 / Rook

 / Knight

Liar-S

Others

Development and releases
Dynamic Chord is an otome visual novel game developed and published by Honeybee Black, an imprint of Honeybee. So far, the project has released 4 Windows games and 3 PlayStation Vita ports. Each band has also released several singles and albums.

Other media
An anime adaptation was first announced via the project's official website. Shigenori Kageyama directs the anime at Studio Pierrot. He's also in charge of series composition and penning the scripts alongside Kyōko Katsuya. Yasuomi Umetsu adapting Ryō Fujiwara's art into animation. Akemi Nagao is in charge of color design while Hiromi Sasaki handles the sound direction at Zack Promotion. The voice actors from the game returns to the anime. rêve parfait performs the opening theme titled "p.s. i hate you♡xxx" while Showtaro Morikubo performs the ending theme titled "because the sky..." under his character name Yorito Kisaka.

References

External links
Official website 
Anime official website at TBS 

2017 anime television series debuts
2014 video games
2016 video games
Anime television series based on video games
Otome games
Pierrot (company)
PlayStation Vita games
Sentai Filmworks
Video games developed in Japan
Visual novels
Windows games